Yellowstone National Park is home to four amphibian species and seven species of reptiles.  None of the species are endangered or threatened.  The glacial nature of and dry conditions in Yellowstone are likely responsible for the relatively low number of amphibian and reptile species in Yellowstone,.

See also
 Animals of Yellowstone

Further reading

References 

Yellowstone National Park
Yellowstone
Yellowstone
Lists of fauna of Wyoming
Yellowstone National Park
Yellowstone National Park, List 2
A
Yellowstone